Néstor Fausto Antón Giudice (19 April 1924 – May 1952) was a Uruguayan basketball player. He competed in the men's tournament at the 1948 Summer Olympics.

References

External links
 

1924 births
1952 deaths
Date of death missing
Uruguayan men's basketball players
Olympic basketball players of Uruguay
Basketball players at the 1948 Summer Olympics
Sportspeople from Montevideo
20th-century Uruguayan people